Jeannie Berlin (born Jeannie Brette May; November 1, 1949) is an American film, television and stage actress and screenwriter, the daughter of Elaine May. She is best-known for her role in the 1972 comedy film The Heartbreak Kid, for which she received Academy Award and Golden Globe nominations for Best Supporting Actress. She later played the leading role in Sheila Levine Is Dead and Living in New York (1975), and in the 2010s returned to screen appearing in films such as Margaret (2011), Inherent Vice (2014), Café Society (2016), and The Fabelmans (2022). She also appeared in the HBO miniseries The Night Of (2016) and had recurring roles in the Amazon Prime series Hunters (2020), and the HBO series Succession (2019-2021).

Early life
Born in Los Angeles, California, Berlin is the daughter of actress, comedienne, screenwriter, and director Elaine May (née Berlin) and inventor Marvin May. Elaine May directed Berlin in the 1972 film The Heartbreak Kid, which garnered her Golden Globe and Academy Award nominations for Best Supporting Actress. Berlin chose to use her mother's maiden name for her stage name.

Career
Berlin made her screen debut appearing in an supporting role in the made-for-television film In Name Only starring Eve Arden. She acted on the New York stage and began appearing in a number of films, include Getting Straight (1970), The Strawberry Statement (1970), Move (1970), The Baby Maker (1970), Portnoy's Complaint (1971), and Bone (1972).

In 1972, Berlin's performance in the comedy film The Heartbreak Kid directed by her mother with a screenplay by Neil Simon, garnered her Golden Globe  and Academy Award nominations for Best Supporting Actress. She also won National Society of Film Critics Award for Best Supporting Actress. In article for The New York Times by John Gruen he wrote: "What is more, every critic said that Jeannie looks, sounds and acts exactly like her mother. One critic even said that she is a much better actress than her mother . . . 'with real blood coursing through her.' Anyway, this piece will set out to prove that Jeannie Berlin, who looks, talks, and acts exactly like Elaine May, is, in fact, Elaine May's 23‐year‐old daughter, and a person in her own right, even though . . . well, there's just no denying it, she looks, sounds, and acts exactly like her mother."

In 1975, Berlin played a leading role in the romantic comedy film Sheila Levine Is Dead and Living in New York. The film was not well received by critics: Stanley Eichelbaum from San Francisco Examiner noted that "Jeannie is cold and hasn't the inner glow the appeal and magnetism that an actress needs to carry a film." The following year, she had a leading role in "Old Fashioned Murder", an episode of the NBC detective drama series Columbo. Berlin did not act on film or television again until 1990, when she appeared in and co-wrote the screenplay for the comedy-drama film In the Spirit starring her mother alongside Marlo Thomas and Olympia Dukakis.

Berlin appeared in a number of off-Broadway productions in 1990s. She made her Broadway theatre debut in May's play After the Night and the Music in 2005. In 2012, she appeared in the play Other Desert Cities at the Mark Taper Forum in Los Angeles. After an extended absence of more than a decade from acting in films, in 2011 she co-starred in Margaret, a psychological drama film starring Anna Paquin. She received positive reviews from film critics and was nominated for National Society of Film Critics and Boston Society of Film Critics Award for Best Supporting Actress. She later appeared in Paul Thomas Anderson's crime film Inherent Vice (2014), and Woody Allen's romantic comedy-drama Café Society (2016).

In 2016, Berlin received positive reviews for her performance as prosecutor Helen Weiss in the HBO miniseries The Night Of. She was a promising contender for an Primetime Emmy Award for Outstanding Supporting Actress in a Limited or Anthology Series or Movie category, but she did not receive a nomination. In 2018 she played the President of the United States in the Hulu drama series  The First, and the following year was cast as Cyd Peach, the head of the Roys’ Fox News–esque TV station in the HBO drama series, Succession. In 2020, she had a recurring role in the Amazon Prime Video drama series, Hunters playing the grandmother of lead character. In 2022, she starred in the coming-of-age drama film The Fabelmans directed by Steven Spielberg.

Filmography

Film

Television

Awards and nominations

References

External links
 
 
 
 

1949 births
Living people
American film actresses
American stage actresses
American television actresses
Actresses from Los Angeles
Jewish American actresses
20th-century American actresses
21st-century American actresses
21st-century American Jews
American Jews